Rudolph Romeo Riddell (11 February 1847 - 8 September 1913) was a Lieutenant in the United States Army who was awarded the Medal of Honor for gallantry during the American Civil War. On 6 April 1865, Riddell captured the flag of the 6th Alabama Cavalry of the Confederate Army. For this action, he was awarded the Medal of Honor on 10 May 1865.

Personal life 
Riddell was born in Hamilton, New York on 11 February 1847 to parents David Riddell and Polly Parks Riddell. He was the younger of two children. In 1869, he married Annie Naomi Palmer (1853 - 1934). He had no known children. Riddell died on 8 September 1913 in Hamilton and was buried in Madison Street Cemetery in Hamilton.

Military service 
Riddell enlisted in the Union Army as a drummer at the age of 15. He was eventually promoted to the rank of Lieutenant and commanded Company I of the 61st New York Volunteer Infantry. On 6 April 1865, during the Battle of Sailor's Creek near Farmville, Virginia, he captured the flag of the 6th Alabama Cavalry of the Confederate Army. This action allowed him to receive the Medal of Honor on 10 May 1865. He was honorably discharged from the Army in 1865.

Riddell's Medal of Honor citation reads:

References 

1847 births
1913 deaths
Union Army officers
United States Army Medal of Honor recipients
American Civil War recipients of the Medal of Honor
People of New York (state) in the American Civil War